An alumnus of St Stephen's College, Delhi is also called a Stephanian. Alumni of the college include distinguished economists, CEOs of Fortune 500 companies, scientists, mathematicians, historians, writers, bureaucrats, journalists, lawyers, politicians including several Members of Parliament (MP) in India, as well as the Heads of State of three countries, and sportspersons including a number of olympians and international athletes. The names in this list are presented in alphabetical order of surname/family name. This is not an exhaustive list.

Politicians 

 Fakhruddin Ali Ahmed (1905-1977), former President of India
 Nuruddin Ahmed (1904-1975), barrister, three-time Mayor of Delhi and Padma Bhushan recipient
 Salim Ahmed Salim, former Prime Minister of Tanzania
 Mani Shankar Aiyar, MP, former Cabinet Minister
 Ranjib Biswal, Member of Parliament, Rajya Sabha
 Amir Chand Bombwal, freedom fighter
 Prodyut Bora, BJP IT cell founder
 Brij Krishna Chandiwala, Indian freedom fighter and social worker; political associate of Mahatma Gandhi
 Swapan Dasgupta, Rajya Sabha MP
 Har Dayal, Indian nationalist revolutionary and freedom fighter
 Sandeep Dikshit, MP
 Jarbom Gamlin (1961-2014), former Chief Minister of Arunachal Pradesh
 Gopalkrishna Gandhi, IAS, former Governor of West Bengal
 Rahul Gandhi, MP, Former President Congress
 Indrajit Gupta (1919-2001), former MP and Home Minister of India
 Amit Jogi, member, Janta Congress Chhattisgarh
 Najeeb Jung, former lieutenant governor of Delhi
 Salman Khurshid, former MP, External Affairs Minister, former Law Minister
 Sucheta Kripalani, former Chief Minister of Uttar Pradesh;  India's first woman Chief Minister
 Ashwani Kumar, former additional solicitor general of India, Rajya Sabha MP
 Atishi Marlena, member of the Political Affairs Committee of Aam Aadmi Party
 Chandan Mitra, former Rajya Sabha MP
 Sangay Ngedup, Former Prime Minister of Bhutan
 Naveen Patnaik, 14th Chief Minister of Odisha (2000–incumbent)
 Sachin Pilot, Deputy Chief Minister, Rajasthan
 Chhotu Ram (1881-1945), pre-partition politician, knighted in 1937
 Kapil Sibal, MP, former Law Minister of India
 Digvijaya Singh, 14th Chief Minister of Madhya Pradesh from 1993 to 2003
 Kalikesh Narayan Singh Deo, Lok Sabha MP, leader of the Biju Janata Dal 
 Lakshman Singh, 5 term Member of Parliament
 Natwar Singh, MP, former Foreign Minister of India
 R.K. Singh, IAS, former Home Secretary to the Government of India, Minister of State (Independent Charge) for Power and Renewable Energy, Minister of State for Skill Development and Entrepreneurship
 Virbhadra Singh, Chief Minister of Himachal Pradesh
 Shashi Tharoor, MP, former Minister of State, former Under-Secretary-General of the UN

 Jigme Thinley, Former Prime Minister of Bhutan
 Savita Vaidhyanathan, American politician; mayor of Cupertino, California
 Khandu Wangchuk, Former Prime Minister of Bhutan
 Sitaram Yechuri, General Secretary of Communist Party of India (Marxist)
 Bashir Hussain Zaidi, CIE, member of the first Lok Sabha; former Vice-Chancellor of Aligarh Muslim University
 Muhammad Zia-ul-Haq (1924-1988), former President of Pakistan

Law
 Badar Durrez Ahmed, former Chief Justice (Acting) of the Delhi High Court
 Bishwajit Bhattacharyya, former Additional Solicitor General of India
 Dhananjaya Y. Chandrachud, 50th Chief Justice of India
 Ranjan Gogoi, 46th Chief Justice of India (2018–2019)
 Bhupinder Nath Kirpal, 31st Chief Justice of India
 Sanjay Kishan Kaul, Judge, Supreme Court of India
 Sanjiv Khanna, Judge, Supreme Court of India
 Hima Kohli, Judge, Supreme Court of India
 Madan Lokur, Judge, Supreme Court of India
 Karuna Nundy, lawyer, Supreme Court of India
 Vikramajit Sen, Judge, Supreme Court of India
 Abhishek Singhvi, Senior Advocate, Supreme Court of India; Rajya Sabha MP from West Bengal

Bureaucrats
 Montek Singh Ahluwalia, economist; Deputy Chairman of the Planning Commission; former Finance Secretary
 Javeed Ahmad, IPS, Director of National Institute of Criminology and Forensic Sciences, and former Director General of Uttar Pradesh Police
 Yamini Aiyar, Chief Executive and President of Centre for Policy Research
 Asaf Ali (1888-1953), Indian ambassador to the US, Governor of Odisha
 Pratyaya Amrit, IAS, Principal Secretary in Government of Bihar
 Jaimini Bhagwati, IFS officer and World bank economist
 Sanjay Bhattacharya, Indian ambassador to Turkey
 Ajay Bisaria, IFS, High Commissioner of India to Canada
 M. N. Buch, IAS officer and urban planner, considered “the architect of modern Bhopal”
 Pulok Chatterji, IAS, Principal Secretary to the Prime Minister of India (2011-2014)
 Navin Chawla, former chief election commissioner of India
 Shaktikanta Das, 25th Governor of the Reserve Bank of India
 Parvez Dewan, IAS officer
 Vijay Keshav Gokhale, 32nd Foreign Secretary of India
 Deepak Gupta, Chairman Union Public Service Commission
 Wajahat Habibullah, first  Chief Information Commissioner of India
 Salman Haidar, IFS, Foreign Secretary of India
 Lieutenant General Syed Ata Hasnain, high-ranking officer of the Indian Army
 Gulrez Hoda, IAS officer
 Parameswaran Iyer, IAS, led Swachh Bharat Mission
 S. Jaishankar, IFS, Foreign Secretary of India, current External Affairs Minister of India
 Ajay Narayan Jha, former Finance Secretary and member of Fifteenth Finance Commission
 Ashok Kamte (1965-2008), officer of Indian Police Services, killed in action during 26/11 attack.
 Amitabh Kant, CEO of NITI Aayog (2016–incumbent)
 Vijayendra Nath Kaul, former Comptroller and Auditor General of India (2002-2008)
 Amit Khare, IAS, Principal Secretary (Finance), Government of Jharkhand
 Rahul Khullar, IAS Officer, former Chairman Telecom Regulatory Authority of India
 Neeraj Kumar, IPS, Former Delhi Police Commissioner 
 VJ Kurian, Former managing director of Cochin International Airport and Addl. Chief Secretary Govt of Kerala
 Ved Marwah, officer of IPS
 Rajiv Mehrishi, IAS, Comptroller and Auditor General of India, former Home Secretary and Finance Secretary of India
 Shivshankar Menon, IFS, former National Security Adviser of India
 Vinay Mittal, Chairman Union Public Service Commission
 Monika Kapil Mohta, Ambassador of India to Switzerland
 Nirmal Kumar Mukarji, officer of ICS
 Anshu Prakash, IAS, former Chief Secretary of Delhi 
 Vinay Sheel Oberoi, IAS officer
 Armstrong Pame, IAS officer
 S. Y. Quraishi, former Chief Election Commissioner of India
 Aftab Seth, eminent IFS officer
 Ajit Seth, 30th Cabinet Secretary of India
 Kamalesh Sharma, IFS, 5th Secretary General of the Commonwealth of Nations
 Harsh Vardhan Shringla, 33rd Foreign Secretary of India
 A P Singh, former director of CBI
 Alwyn Didar Singh, former secretary general of FCCCI
 N. K. Singh, chairman of Fifteenth Finance Commission of India
 Taranjit Singh Sandhu, IFS, current Indian Ambassador to the United States
 Pradeep Kumar Sinha, IAS, Cabinet Secretary of India
 Yashvardhan Kumar Sinha, former High Commissioner of India to the United Kingdom
 Rakesh Sood, eminent IFS officer
 Vikram Sood, former Director of the  Research and Analysis Wing (RAW)
 Prajapati Trivedi, economist and first Secretary, Performance Management Division, Cabinet Secretariat
 Alok Verma, Former Director of Central Bureau of Investigation
Asim Arun Indian Police Service

Business

 Ashok Alexander, former Director, McKinsey & Company & Head, Bill & Melinda Gates Foundation
 Rahul Bajaj, chairman, Bajaj Group
 Ajaypal Singh Banga, former CEO of MasterCard
 Sarthak Behuria, former Chairman Indian Oil Corporation
 Sanjeev Bikhchandani, Internet entrepreneur, founder Info Edge, founder Ashoka University
 Sanjay Dalmia, Chairman Dalmia Group
 Dinesh Dayal, Chief Operating Officer at L'Oréal India
 Manisha Girotra, CEO Moelis & Company India
 Piyush Gupta, CEO, DBS Bank
 Deep Kalra, founder and CEO of MakeMyTrip
 Jagdish Khattar, IAS, former managing director, Maruti Suzuki
 Siddhartha Lal, CEO, Eicher Motors
 Arun Maira, former Chairman Boston Consulting Group
 Vikram Singh Mehta, former CEO of Shell India
 Ivan Menezes, CEO of Diageo
 Piyush Pandey, Executive Chairman and Creative Director, Ogilvy and Mather India and South Asia
 Vipul Ved Prakash, Internet entrepreneur and co-founder of Topsy and Cloudmark
 Deepak Puri, founder, chairman and managing director of Moser Baer
 Bharat Ram, industrialist, former chairman and Managing Director Delhi Cloth & General Mills
 Madan Mohan Sabharwal, business executive, social worker and Padma Shri awardee
 Malvinder Mohan Singh, co-founder, Fortis Healthcare
 Shivinder Mohan Singh, co-founder, Fortis Healthcare
 Janmejaya Sinha, Chairman Boston Consulting Group
 Vikram Talwar, Founder & CEO EXL Service
 Gautam Thapar, Chairman Avantha Group
 Ashok Vemuri, former CEO Conduent and iGATE
 Amit Kumar, Global Managing Director, Accenture Strategy & Consulting - Industry X

Performing arts 

 Niret Alva, television producer
 Siddhartha Basu, quiz master
 Kabir Bedi, actor
 Pankaj Butalia, documentary filmmaker
 Richa Chadha, actress
 Safdar Hashmi, founding member of Jana Natya Manch
 Shekhar Kapur, director and producer
 Amit Khanna, triple National Film Award winning producer, founder chairman of Reliance Entertainment
 Arunima Kumar, kuchipudi dancer 
 Raam Reddy, director, Thithi
 Parikshit Sahni, actor
 Divya Seth, actor
 Roshan Seth, actor
 Rajeev Siddhartha, actor
Chandrachur Singh, actor
 Konkana Sen Sharma, actor
 Suraj Sharma, actor (did not graduate)

Writers, poets, artists and critics 

 Saeed Ahmad Akbarabadi (1908-1985), Indian Islamic scholar
 Upamanyu Chatterjee, IAS, author
 Kanika Dhillon, author and screenwriter
 Yashica Dutt, writer
Mahmood Farooqui, prominent Urdu poet, performer and director 
 Rajmohan Gandhi, biographer, recipient Sahitya Akademi Award
 Amitav Ghosh, author
 Ramachandra Guha, author
 Mukul Kesavan, historian, novelist and political and social essayist
 Rajiv Malhotra, author, philanthropist, intellectual, writer
 Mammen Mathew, Chief Editor of the Malayala Manorama, Padma Shri awardee
 Anurag Mathur, author and journalist
 Rajiv Mehrotra, writer, television producer-director, documentary film maker
 Ningombam Bupenda Meitei, essayist and poet in English and Meitei languages
 Satyarth Nayak, Author of Sridevi: The Eternal Screen Goddess and The Emperor's Riddles and Screenwriter for Sony TV epic historical series Porus
 Makarand Paranjape, novelist and poet
 Janice Pariat, author, first Sahitya Akademi Award recipient for English literature from Meghalaya
 Prem Behari Narain Raizada, calligrapher and writer of the Constitution of India
 Maroof Raza, Defence analyst, writer, and educationalist
 Raam Reddy, author, filmmaker
 Jaideep Saikia, author
 Allan Sealy, writer, finalist Booker Prize
 Krishna Kant Shukla, physicist, musician, poet, ecologist and educator
 Khushwant Singh (1915-2014), author
 Parismita Singh, author, illustrator, graphic novelist
 Ashok Vajpeyi, Hindi poet, essayist, and chairman, Lalit Kala Akademi India's National Academy of Arts, Govt of India
 Nirmal Verma, writer, novelist, activist and translator
 Ramkumar Verma (1905-1990), Hindi poet

Art 

 Aditya Arya, photographer 
 Shakti Maira, artist, sculptor, writer
 Rajeev Sethi, art curator, scenographer, designer
 Ram Kumar (artist), artist, awarded Padma Bhushan

Academics

Social Sciences and Humanities  
 Economics
 Kusum Ailawadi, economist; Professor of Marketing at Tuck School of Business, Dartmouth College
 Amit Bando, economist; inaugural executive director, International Partnership for Energy Efficiency Cooperation (IPEEC), OECD
 Kaushik Basu, economist; Senior Vice President and Chief Economist of the World Bank; former CEA to the Government
 Bhaskar Chakravorti, economist; Dean, The Fletcher School at Tufts University
 Ajay Chhibber, economist; first Director General of the Independent Evaluation Office, Government of India
 Siddhartha Chib, econometrician; Fellow of the American Statistical Association
 Pradeep Dubey, game theorist and professor at Yale University
 Ranjay Gulati, organizational behaviour scholar, Professor of Business Administration at the Harvard Business School
 Sanjay Jain, development economist; Senior Fellow in the Department of Economics at the University of Oxford
 Rajiv Kumar, economist, vice-chairman of the NITI Aayog
 Deepak Lal (1940 – 2020), economist; former President of Mont Pelerin Society
 Shailendra Raj Mehta, economist, president and director of MICA
 Deepak Nayyar, economist; former Chief Economic Advisor to the Government of India
 Rohini Pande, development economist; professor at Yale University
 Manoj Pant, Director Indian Institute of Foreign Trade
 Prabhat Patnaik, Marxist economist
 Sunder Ramaswamy, development economist, Inaugural Vice Chancellor of Krea University
 Abhijit Sen, former member of planning commission
 Arunava Sen, economist; recipient of the Infosys Prize
 Mihir Shah, former member of planning commission
 Arvind Subramanian, economist; former Chief Economic Advisor to the Government of India 
 Bhaskar Vira, economist and geographer; professor of Political Economy, Head of Department of Geography, University of Cambridge
 Arvind Virmani, economist; former Chief Economic Advisor to the Government of India 
 History
 Basudev Chatterji, historian; former chairperson of the Indian Council of Historical Research
 Nayanjot Lahiri, historian; recipient of the Infosys Prize
 Amrita Narlikar, Fellow, Darwin College, Cambridge
 Gyanendra Pandey, former chair of the Department of Anthropology at Johns Hopkins University
 Upinder Singh, historian; recipient of the Infosys Prize
 Sanjay Subrahmanyam, economic historian; recipient of the Infosys Prize, Dan David Prize; Professor at UCLA
 Ishtiaq Hussain Qureshi; Pakistani historian
 Chetan Singh, historian; former Director of the Indian Institute of Advanced Studies
 Hari Sen, historian
 Philosophy
 Divya Dwivedi, philosopher
 Shaj Mohan, philosopher

Natural and Mathematical Sciences  
 Siva Athreya, mathematician and Shanti Swarup Bhatnagar laureate
 Raghu Raj Bahadur, theoretical statistician; formerly Professor at University of Chicago; considered "one of the architects of the modern theory of mathematical statistics"
 V. Balakrishnan, theoretical physicist 
 Utpal Banerjee, molecular biologist; Distinguished Professor at UCLA; Fellow of the American Academy of Arts and Sciences
 Charusita Chakravarty, chemical physicist and Shanti Swarup Bhatnagar laureate
 Eknath Prabhakar Ghate, mathematician and Shanti Swarup Bhatnagar laureate
 Suraj N. Gupta, theoretical physicist
 Naeem Ahmad Khan, Pakistani nuclear physicist; former secretary Pakistan Atomic Energy Commission
 Deepak Kumar (1946-2016), physicist and Shanti Swarup Bhatnagar laureate
 Krishna Kumar (chemist), chairman, Department of Chemistry, Tufts University (2006–2009; 2012–2018)
 Satish Chandra Maheshwari (1933-2019), molecular biologist and Shanti Swarup Bhatnagar Prize recipient
 Venkatesh Narayanamurti, physicist, former Dean of the School of Engineering and Applied Sciences at Harvard University
 Pran Nath, particle physicist, recipient Alexander von Humboldt Prize
 Neelakantha Bhanu Prakash, the "fastest human calculator in the world"
 Ramamurti Rajaraman, theoretical physicist, Shanti Swarup Bhatnagar laureate, Leo Szilard Awardee, former Co-chair International Panel on Fissile Materials
 Vaidyeswaran Rajaraman, computer pioneer, Padma Bhushan recipient and Shanti Swarup Bhatnagar laureate
 Kamalini Ramdas, Professor of Management Science and Operations and Deloitte Chair in Innovation & Entrepreneurship at London Business School
 Anupam Saikia, mathematician, Cambridge Math Wrangler
 Dinesh Singh, mathematician, 21st Vice-Chancellor of the University of Delhi
 Manik Varma, computer scientist, Shanti Swarup Bhatnagar laureate

Media and journalism 

 Shiv Aroor, editor and anchor at India Today (TV channel)
 Raghav Bahl, former Director of Network 18, founder of The Quint
 Shereen Bhan, Managing Editor of CNBC-TV18 and World Economic Forum's Young Global Leaders 2009
 Ajit Bhattacharjea (1924-2011), newspaper editor, the Hindustan Times, The Times of India and The Indian Express
 Vikram Chandra, former CEO,  NDTV Group
 Arvind Narayan Das, Founding Editor, Biblio
 Parag Kumar Das, human rights activist and Assamese journalist assassinated in 1996
 David Devadas, journalist, writer and columnist; expert on Kashmir conflict
 Saba Dewan, documentary film maker
 Barkha Dutt, television journalist, columnist, group editor with NDTV
 Bhaskar Ghose, former Secretary, Ministry of Information and Broadcasting, former Director General of Doordarshan 
 Sagarika Ghose, journalist, news anchor and author
 Samir Jain, Vice-chairman of The Times Group (Bennett, Coleman & Co. Ltd.)
 Prem Shankar Jha, economist, journalist and writer
 Novy Kapadia, football journalist, critic and commentator
 Siddharth Kak, documentary filmmaker and creator of TV show Surabhi
 Ritu Kapur, media entrepreneur
 Arun Shourie, journalist, author and politician; winner of the Ramon Magsaysay Award
 Sonia Singh, editorial director of NDTV
 Aman Sethi, journalist and writer; editor-in-chief of HuffPost India
 Sreenath Sreenivasan, former Dean Columbia School of Journalism
 Paranjoy Guha Thakurta, journalist, writer, and documentary maker; former Editor, Economic and Political Weekly
 George Verghese (1927–2014), editor of the Hindustan Times and The Indian Express, winner of the Ramon Magsaysay Award

Sports 

 Neha Aggarwal, Olympian
 Kirti Azad, Cricketer, winner of the 1983 Cricket World Cup
 Ajeet Bajaj, mountaineer, part of first father-daughter duo to scale Mount Everest
 Ranjit Bhatia, Olympian
 Unmukt Chand, Captain of the Indian U-19 Cricket team; Winner of the 2012 Under-19 Cricket World Cup
 Anjum Chopra, former Captain of Indian Women Cricket Team
 Michael Dalvi, Indian Cricketer 
 Hari Dang, educationist and mountaineer
 Ashok Gandotra, Indian Cricketer
 Piyush Kumar, Represented India in the 2000 Sydney Olympics
 Arun Lal, Indian Cricketer 
 Mirza Masood, Olympic Gold Medalist
 Vijay Mehra, Emirati cricketer
 Jaspal Rana, Gold Medallist at the 1994 Asian Games & 1998 Commonwealth Games
 Sandeep Sejwal, Olympian
 Akanksha Singh, Captain, India Women's National Basketball Team
 Karni Singh, Olympian
 Mansher Singh, Olympian
 Ranjit Singh (athlete), Olympian
 Randhir Singh (sport shooter), Olympian; Indian representative to the International Olympic Committee
 Mandip Singh Soin, mountaineer, explorer, Fellow of the Royal Geographical Society

Social Work 

 John Dayal, human rights and Christian political activist
 Vrinda Grover, lawyer, researcher, and human rights and women's rights activist
 Harsh Mander, former IAS officer, human rights activist
 Sanjit Roy, social activist and educator; founder Barefoot College

Faculty 
This list includes notable faculty members who served at St. Stephen’s College, Delhi, but did not receive any degree from the college. This is not an exhaustive list. 
 Mohammad Amin, historian; Padma Bhushan Awardee
 CF Andrews, educator, social reformer, and activist for Indian Independence
 PL Bhatnagar, mathematician, known for Bhatnagar–Gross–Krook operator; Padma Bhushan Awardee
 Virander Singh Chauhan, scientist; worked on genetic engineering and biotechnology; known for contributions to the development of a recombinant vaccine for malaria
 Gopi Chand Narang, poet and literary critic; Padma Bhushan Awardee
 S. K. Rudra, first Indian principal of St Stephen's College, Delhi
 Percival Spear,  (1901–1982); historian of modern South Asia
 Valson Thampu, former Principal; served from 2009 to 2016
 Anil Wilson, former Principal; served from 1991 to 2007

References

External links 
 Official alumni list

Stephanians